Valens Acidalius (156725 May 1595), also known as Valtin Havekenthal, was a German critic and poet writing in the Latin language.

Life
Acidalius was born in Wittstock, the son of a Lutheran pastor. He studied at the universities of Rostock, Greifswald and Helmstedt. Even in his early youth, his Latin poems caused a stir. In 1590 he accompanied his friend Daniel Bucretius (Daniel Rindfleisch) to Italy where he published his first literary work, an edition of Velleius Paterculus. Acidalius studied philosophy and medicine in Bologna and was awarded a doctorate degree in both disciplines.

He was however not attracted by the practical work as a medic and therefore concentrated on the criticism of classic works. He returned to Germany in 1593 after several fever attacks, moving to Breslau, the home town of his friend Bucretius. In 1595 Acidalius became a Catholic and in spring of the same year, he accepted an invitation of his friend and supporter, the episcopal chancellor Wacker von Wackenfels to Neisse. He died there of a fever at the age of 28.

Publications
 Velleius Paterculus, 1590, Padua
 Animadversiones in Curtium, 1594, Frankfurt

Posthumously:
 a collection of poems, elegies, odes and epigrams, 1603, Liegnitz
 Centuria prima epistolarum, 1606, Hanau
 Divinationes et interpretationes in comoedias Plauti, 1607, Frankfurt, 566 pages
 Notae in Taciti opera, 1607, Hannover
 Notae in Panegyrici veteres, 1607, Heidelberg

Disputed:
 Disputatio nova contra mulieres, qua probatur eas homines non esse, 1595, probably printed in Zerbst, 11 sheets 4°. A tract which caused much annoyance among the theologians of the time because of its blasphemic precepts. His attackers overlooked the fact that the tract was intended as a parody on the Socinian methods of refuting the divine nature of Christ. During his lifetime, Acidalius denied having written these papers. It is believed that while Acidalius did not actually write the tract, he was nevertheless instrumental in its creation. Thus, the actual author remains anonymous.
Czapla, Ralf G. [Ed.]; Burkard, Georg [Ed.]; Burkard, Georg [Trans.]: Disputatio nova contra mulieres, qua probatur eas homines non esse / Acidalius, Valens. (Neue Disputation gegen die Frauen zum Erweis, dass sie keine Menschen sind). Heidelberg 2006. 

 References 

Sources
 Allgemeine Deutsche Biographie''—online version at German Wikisource

External links

, in the catalog of the German National Library
, in Rostock Matrikelportal
, in VD 17
, in VD 16
, by Johann Heinrich Zedler in Grosses vollständiges Universal-Lexicon, band 1, Leipzig 1732, column 346 f.

1567 births
1595 deaths
People from Ostprignitz-Ruppin
Converts to Roman Catholicism from Lutheranism
German Renaissance humanists
German Roman Catholics
People from the Margraviate of Brandenburg
University of Rostock alumni
University of Greifswald alumni
University of Helmstedt alumni
Infectious disease deaths in Germany